Cerro Alto may refer to:

 Cerro Alto (Argentina)
 Cerro Alto (Chile)
 Cerro Alto (San Luis Obispo County, California)
 Cerro Alto (Kings County, California)
 Cerro Alto (Cibola County, New Mexico)
 Cerro Alto (Taos County, New Mexico)
 Cerro Alto (Puerto Rico)
 Cerro El Alto in Puerto Rico
 Cerro Alto Mountain in Texas, USA